South Hills is a census-designated place (CDP) in Jefferson County, Montana, United States. The population was 517 at the 2010 census.

Geography
South Hills is in northern Jefferson County. It is bordered to the south and east by unincorporated Montana City and to the north by the city of Helena in Lewis and Clark County.

The community is drained by east-flowing tributaries of Prickly Pear Creek, which flows north to the Missouri River.

Demographics

References

Census-designated places in Jefferson County, Montana
Census-designated places in Montana